Hopkins House may refer to:

United Kingdom 
 Hopkins House (Hampstead), a Hi-tech house created in 1976 by Michael Hopkins and Partners

United States 
 Hopkins House (Milton, Delaware), listed on the NRHP in Sussex County, Delaware
 John M. Hopkins Cabin, Folkston, Georgia, listed on the NRHP in Charlton County, Georgia
 William Hopkins House, Soda Springs, Idaho, listed on the NRHP in Caribou County, Idaho
 Hopkins House (Tecumseh, Kansas), NRHP-listed
 Hopkins House (North Middletown, Kentucky), listed on the National Register of Historic Places in Bourbon County, Kentucky
 Hopkins House (Marion, Louisiana), listed on the NRHP in Union Parish, Louisiana
 Elisha Hopkins House, Somerville, Massachusetts, NRHP-listed
 Hopkins House (Lockport, New York), NRHP-listed
 Hopkins Cottage, Saranac Lake, New York, NRHP-listed
 Roswell Hopkins Residence, Ghent, Ohio, listed on the NRHP in Summit County, Ohio
 Hopkins Sandstone House and Farmstead, Ripley, Oklahoma, listed on the NRHP in Payne County, Oklahoma
 Esek Hopkins House, Providence, Rhode Island, NRHP-listed
 Gov. Stephen Hopkins House, Providence, Rhode Island, NRHP-listed
 Lander-Hopkins House, Victoria, Texas, listed on the NRHP in Victoria County, Texas
 Willis Hopkins House, Wauwatosa, Wisconsin, listed on the NRHP in Milwaukee County, Wisconsin
 Hopkins House (Boston College)

See also 
 Hopkins Farm (disambiguation)